Maria Vasilyevna Semyonova (Rus. Мария Васильевна Семёнова, also spelled Semenova; born November 1, 1958 in Leningrad, Soviet Union) is a Russian writer of fantasy and historical fiction and a poet. Most of her books are based on Slavic mythology, as well as on Russian and Norse pagan traditions. She's best known for Wolfhound (Volkodav in Russian) fantasy series, that was adapted into 2007 film Wolfhound of The Grey Hound Clan and the 2006 video game Requital. Semyonova is also known for her numerous translations of western fantasy books into the Russian language.

Biography
Semyonova graduated from Leningrad State University of Aerospace Instrument Making and worked as a computer specialist in the 1980s in a research institute.

From her childhood, Maria was interested in Medieval Rus, its traditions and mythology, as well as Viking Age. Her early books, written in Soviet era, were historical fiction about Vikings, medieval Russians and Finns, usually set in Scandinavia or Novgorod. She wrote about such historical persons as Ragnar Lodbrok, Aella of Northumbria, Rurik, Oleg and Vadim, among others. However, most of these books were not published until 1996, as Perestroika-era publishers were not interested in historical fiction.

After the fall of Soviet Union, Semyonova abandoned her computer work and became literary translator from English, working for Severo-Zapad. She translated several books by Robert E. Howard, Robin Hobb, L. Sprague de Camp, Margaret Weis and Tracy Hickman, among others. This is where she discovered Western fantasy and became fond of it. However, she was disappointed with a wave of Russian fantasy writers becoming copycats of their western colleagues. Semenova decided to write a fantasy novel based exclusively on Russian tradition and mythology. "If you wanted fantasy, you get it. But why do you prefer the chewed-out Tolkien-esque sandwich, while our richest native tradition stays forgotten?" - she would recall.

In 1995, Wolfhound was released. The book, published by Severo-Zapad, was an immediate success, it spanned a series of sequels, a multi-author project, a film and a TV series. Often compared to Robert E. Howard Conan series, Wolfhound was intended as Conan's counterpart: a protector of the weak rather than adventurer. The books also included a large amount of poetry by Semenova, each chapter was accompanied by a verse. Several other Semenova books, including Dark Grey Wolf series, are set in the same universe with Wolfhound. Success of her fantasy novels allowed Semenova to publish her earlier historical books as well.

Maria Semyonova also wrote several lesser-known political detective books, together with Felix Razumovsky and various other co-authors. She also wrote a popular history encyclopedia "We, Slavs!" about the culture and traditions of Russian paganism.

Semyonova is an amateur aikido fighter.

Works

Novels 

 Ведун, Vedun (1985). Novella - Historical fiction, set in Viking Age Scandinavia
 Орлиная круча, Orlinaâ kruča) (1989). Novella - Historical fiction, set in Viking Age Scandinavia
 Pelko and Wolves (Пелко и волки, Pelko i volki) (1992) - Historical fiction, set in Medieval Rus

 The Wolfhound series: - Fantasy fiction
 Wolfhound (Волкодав, Volkodav) (1995)
 Wolfhound: The Right for a Fight (Волкодав. Право на поединок, Volkodav. Pravo na poedinok) (1996)
 Wolfhound: Stone of Rage (Волкодав. Истовик-камень, Volkodav. Istovik-kamenʹ) (2000)
 Wolfhound: Sign of the Way (Волкодав. Знамение пути, Volkodav. Znamenie puti) (2003)
 Wolfhound: Emerald Mountains (Волкодав. Самоцветные горы, Volkodav. Samocvetnye gory) (2003)

 The Nine Worlds (Девять миров, Devâtʹ mirov) (1996) - Fantasy fiction
 Two Tempests (Две грозы, Dve grozy) (1996) - Fantasy fiction
 Valkyrie: The One I Always Wait For (Валькирия: Тот, кого я всегда жду, Valʹkiriâ: Tot, kogo â vsegda ždu) (1996) - Historical fiction, set in Viking Age Scandinavia
 A Duel with Dragon (Поединок со Змеем, Poedinok so Zmeem) (1996) - Historical fiction, set in Viking Age Scandinavia
 Swans' Road (Лебединая дорога, Lebedinaâ doroga) (1996) - Historical fiction, set in Viking Age Scandinavia and in Medieval Rus

 Skunk series: - Detectives
 The Same Men and Skunk (Те же и Скунс, Te že i Skuns) (1997, with Ye. Milkova, V. Voskoboinikov)
 The Same Men and Skunk 2 (Те же и Скунс — 2, Te že i Skuns - 2) (1999, with V. Voskoboinikov, F. Razumovski)
 Order (Заказ, Zakaz) (1999, with K. Kulchitski)

 Sword of the Dead (Знак Сокола, Znak Sokola, AKA Меч мёртвых, Meč mërtvyh) (1998, with Andrey Konstantinov) - Historical fiction, set in Medieval Rus
 Преступление без срока давности, Prestuplenie bez sroka davnosti (1999, with F. Razumovski) - Detectives
 Вкус крови, Vkus krovi (1999, with Ye. Milkova) - Detectives
 Магия успеха, Magiâ uspeha (2000, with F. Razumovski) - Detectives
 Дядя Леша, Dâdâ Leša (2000, with Ye. Milkova) - Detectives
 Окольцованные злом, Okolʹcovannye zlom (2000, with F. Razumovski) - Detectives

 Kudeyar series (with Felix Razumovsky): - Detectives
 Kudeyar: The Crimson Flower (Кудеяр. Аленький цветочек, Kudeâr. Alenʹkij cvetoček) (2001)
 Kudeyar: The Tower of Babel (Кудеяр. Вавилонская башня, Kudeâr. Vavilonskaâ bašnâ) (2006)

 Привычка жить, Privyčka žitʹ (2005) - sci-fi

 Dark Grey Wolf series (with Dmitry Tedeyev): - Fantasy fiction
 Where Forest Doesn't Grow (Там, где лес не растет, Tam, gde les ne rastet) (2007)
 Dark Grey Wolf (Бусый Волк, Busyj volk) (2007)
 Dark Grey Wolf: Birch Bark Book (Бусый волк. Берестяная книга, Busyj volk. Berestânaâ kniga) (2009)

 Mistake-2012 series (with Felix Razumovsky): - Detectives
 Game For No Sake (Игра нипочем, Igra nipočem) (2008)
 Joker (Джокер, Džoker) (2009)
 New Game (Новая игра, Novaâ igra) (2010)
 Rough Miser (Мизер вчерную, Mizer včernuû) (2011)

Short story collections 

 Swans Fly Away (Лебеди улетают, Lebedi uletaût) (1989) - Historical fiction, set in Viking Age Scandinavia
 With Vikings for Svalbard (С викингами на Свальбард, S vikingami na Svalʹbard) (1996) - Historical fiction, set in Viking Age Scandinavia
 A Lame Smith (Хромой кузнец, Hromoj kuznec) (2001) - Historical fiction, set in Viking Age Scandinavia
 Новые легенды, Novye legendy (2004, with V. Rybakov) - Fantasy fiction

Short stories 

Uncollected short stories.

 Два короля, Dva korolâ (1996) - Historical fiction, set in Viking Age Scandinavia
 Сольвейг и мы все, Solʹvejg i my vse (1999) - Historical fiction, set in Viking Age Scandinavia

Poems 

 Кубик из красной пластмассы, Kubik iz krasnoj plastmassy (2008). Collection

Nonfiction 

 We, Slavs! (Мы, славяне!, My, slavâne!) (1997) - a popular history encyclopedia

Adaptations
 Wolfhound of The Grey Hound Clan (2007)
 Young Wolfhound (TV, 2007)
 Requital (video game (Microsoft Windows), 2006)

Awards
 1989 The best children's book for Swans Fly Away
 1996  for Wolfhound
 2005 Aelita Award
 2007 Mir Fantastiki Best Fantasy Award for Where Forest Doesn't Grow
 2008 Roscon Award as Writer of the Year

References

External links
 Official website
 Interview with Semenova by Mir Fantastiki (Russian)
 Article on Wolfhound universe by Mir Fantastiki (Russian)

Russian fantasy writers
Russian historical novelists
1958 births
Living people